Unisave is a novel by Axel Madsen published in 1980.

Plot summary
Unisave is a novel that deals with a future in which overpopulation has become the overriding problem.

Reception
Greg Costikyan reviewed Unisave in Ares Magazine #3 and commented that "Despite the potentially intense emotional nature of his subject material, the novel progresses slowly and unemotionally. His one attempt at a dramatic scene fails to communicate any real feeling of drama, and his characters are uniformly bland, almost clones of one another. An remarkable novel to which I have devoted too much space."

References

1980 novels